Giovanni Battista Cavedalis (1794–1858) was an Italian patriot.

Cavedalis was born in  Spilimbergo, in what is now the Province of Pordenone. As a railway engineer, he was in charge of the construction of the railway between Vienna and Ljubljana. In 1848, he took part in the revolution in Venice and was one of the leaders of the Republic of San Marco.

1797 births
1858 deaths
People from the Province of Pordenone
Italian people of the Italian unification
Revolutions of 1848 in the Italian states
Italian engineers
19th-century Italian engineers